Circus Maximus was an American band in the late 1960s, which combined influences from folk music, rock, and jazz into a form of psychedelic rock.

History
The band, originally called the Lost Sea Dreamers, was formed in 1967 by Bob Bruno and Jerry Jeff Walker. Vanguard Records insisted on a name change, as the initials "LSD" were considered too linked to the drug culture. Bruno's song "Wind", from the band's self-titled first album, became a minor hit in the United States, particularly through airplay on "progressive" FM radio stations.

In late December 1967, the band performed in an unusual pair of "Electric Christmas" concerts together with New York Pro Musica, an ensemble that performed early music. There were two 80-minute performances. The material performed included a reworking of 14th-century composer Guillaume de Machaut's "La douce dame jolie" as an English-language song "Sweet Lovely Lady" arranged by Robert M. Bruno for the ensemble, and Bruno original "Chess Game" that, unbeknownst to Bruno but noted by John White, director of the Pro Musica, strongly echoed the "Romanesca", a piece that first appears in 16th-century Spanish lute books.

The concert was not a critical success. Donal Henahan, writing in The New York Times, said that it "fell somewhat short of being the total-environmental trip that was promised… the night summed up most of the esthetic ideas now in the air: incongruity, simultaneity, games theory, the put-on, the parody, the Trip… and the effort to create a 'Total Environment' in which all the senses can come into play." Henahan asserted that the concert's commercial success showed a breakdown in the separation of classical and popular audiences.

Bruno's interest in jazz apparently diverged from Walker's interest in folk music, and by July 1968 the band had broken up and Walker was appearing at the Bitter End in Greenwich Village, sharing a bill with Joni Mitchell. Bassist Gary White went on to write Linda Ronstadt's first solo hit, "Long, Long Time." By 1972 Bruno was appearing with Noah Howard's groups which included several appearances at the NY Free Jazz Festival. He is on the recording called Noah Howard Live at the Village Vanguard with Noah Howard, Franke Lowe, Earl freeman, Juma Sultan, and Rashid Ali (Freedom Records, re-released on Iron Man in 2004 as a CD).
Robert Shelton included the Circus Maximus album Neverland Revisited in a November 1968 list selected to represent "the breadth… of today's rock".

Members
 Jerry Jeff Walker, rhythm guitar and vocal (credited on first album as "Jerry Walker"; died October 23, 2020)
 Bob Bruno, lead guitar, organ, piano, vocal
 David Scherstrom, drums (born June 28, 1946; died February 1, 2017)
 Gary White, bass
 Peter Troutner, vocal and tambourine; also some guitar work (died January 11, 2008)
Source:

Albums
 Circus Maximus, Circus Maximus, Vanguard VRS-9260 (mono) and VSD-79260 (stereo) (1967) 
 "Travelin' Around" (Bob Bruno)
 "Lost Sea Shanty" (Jerry Jeff Walker)
 "Oops, I Can Dance" (Walker)
 "You Know I've Got The Rest Of My Life To Go" (Bruno)
 "Bright Light Lover" (Bruno)
 "Chess Game" (Bruno)
 "People's Game" (Walker)
 "Time Waits" (Bruno)
 "Fading Lady" (Walker)
 "Short-Haired Fathers" (Bruno)
 "Wind" (Bruno)

 Circus Maximus, Neverland Revisited, Vanguard VSD-79274 (1968)
 "Hello Baby" (Bob Bruno)
 "How's Your Sky, Straight Guy Spy" (Bruno)
 "Come Outside, Believe In It" (Jerry Jeff Walker)
 "Parallel" (Bruno)
 "Trying To Live Right" (Walker)
 "Lonely Man" (Bruno)
 "Mixtures" (Walker)
 "Negative Dreamer Girl" (Walker)
 "Neverland" (Bruno)
 "Neverland Revisited" (Bruno)
 "Hansel and Gretel" (Walker)

Source:

Notes

References
 Allen Hughes, "Pro Musica et Circus Maximus To Meet in 14th-Century France; Romanesca Variant Multimedia Collage", The New York Times December 15, 1967. p. 54.
 Theodore Strongin, "Contemporary Classical Disks Rising; 'Catholicity of Taste' Pioneer Disk Top Seller", The New York Times, December 20, 1967. p. 49. 
Harold C. Schonberg, "Like Ahab in Quest of the White Whale", New York Times December 24, 1967. p. 67. Also includes a photo by Henri Dauman depicting members of the various groups involved in the concert. 
Donal Henahan, "Noel Plugged in at Carnegie Hall: Pro Musica Collaborates With Electric Circus; Group Sugarplums Danced on Walls" The New York Times December 27, 1967. p. 44.
Robert Shelton, "Singer-Songwriters Are Making a Comeback; Developing Trend Indicated at the Bitter End by Jerry Walker and Joni Mitchell", The New York Times July 5, 1968. p. 21.
Robert Shelton, "The Best of Rock: A Discography", The New York Times, November 24, 1968. p. H4.

Musical groups established in 1967
Musical groups disestablished in 1968
American psychedelic rock music groups
1967 establishments in the United States